Galiteuthis armata, the  armed cranch squid, is a large species of glass squid. It reaches a mantle length of 61 cm. The species is native to the Atlantic Ocean and has been recorded from Bermuda, Canada, Namibia, and Spain. Armed cranch squids often appear to have bloated bodies, short arms, with thin but muscular mantles. They also contain large buoyancy chambers.

References

 Akimushkin, I.I. 1965. Cephalopods of the seas of the U.S.S.R.. Israel Program for Scientific Translations, Washington, D.C..

External links

Squid
Molluscs described in 1898
Molluscs of the Atlantic Ocean